Crusoe is an adventure-drama television series, based loosely on the 1719 novel Robinson Crusoe by Daniel Defoe. The series' 13 episodes aired on NBC from October 17, 2008 to January 31, 2009, during the first half of the 2008–2009 television season. It follows the adventures of Robinson Crusoe: a man who has been shipwrecked on an island for six years and is desperate to return home to his wife and children. His lone companion is Friday, a native whom Crusoe rescued and taught English.

Cast
Philip Winchester as Robinson Crusoe
He has been shipwrecked on the island for the past six years, and desperately desires to return to his wife and children, whom he left back in England. He goes on the voyage to the new world after he is wrongly accused of being a part of a rebellion against the crown, due in part to the dark intentions of those he believes are his friends. 

As the series progresses, more information is revealed about how he became shipwrecked in the form of flashbacks and cutaways. Allowed to develop away from the bonds of 17th Century life and possessing a talent for things mechanical, the ingenious Crusoe builds a breathtaking and altogether modern home high up in the trees to elude his enemies. In 12 of 13 eps.
Tongayi Chirisa as Friday 
He becomes Crusoe's companion after he is rescued from being a human sacrifice for the tribe of cannibals he was once a part of. Friday is well skilled and knowledgeable, but still feels as though he is an embarrassment to his father. While Crusoe recognizes Friday's wisdom and courage as more than equal to his own, visitors to the island mistake Friday for Crusoe's slave, and are unwilling to see past the color of his skin and simply refer to him as a "savage". In 12 of 13 eps.
Joaquim de Almeida as Santos Santana
He is the Captain of the Spanish Guard who was originally an enemy of Crusoe and Friday. Santana is disgusted by Crusoe's respect for Friday, and makes a deal with his prisoners in order to obtain a treasure buried on the island. However, he appears to have turned over a new leaf after he is captured by cannibals and befriends Friday's father. After escaping the cannibals, he risks his life to save someone he once believed to be a savage, and sustains life-threatening injuries. In 3 of 13 eps.
Mía Maestro as Olivia 
She disguises herself as a young man in order to serve as an assistant physician on an English merchant ship. After the crew mutinies, the ship becomes damaged and the crew makes camp on the island, where Olivia encounters Crusoe and Friday while bathing and out of her disguise. She often helps Crusoe with medical emergencies, and agrees to help Crusoe restore the Captain to power. However, she begins to develop romantic feelings for Crusoe, who remains faithful and in love with his wife. In 7 of 13 eps.
Sam Neill as Jeremiah Blackthorn
He is a friend (at least he claims to be) of the Crusoe family who takes an interest in Robinson's affairs. He agrees to lend the family money in exchange for being named godfather to Crusoe's two children. As the series progresses, it becomes clear that Jeremiah's interest in the Crusoe family is for his own gain. Jeremiah's deceased brother from whom he inherited his fortune is actually the biological father of Robinson Crusoe. He is then not the rightful heir to the Blackthorn fortune, instead it is Robinson Crusoe who should be the rightful heir. In 11 of 13 eps.
Anna Walton as Susannah Crusoe née Tuffley 
She is a childhood friend of Crusoe's whom he later married. Like Crusoe, she lost her mother at a young age, and was raised solely by her father. However, her family is much more wealthy than the Crusoes, which makes most of her family hostile towards her husband. Her brother convinces Crusoe to make a financial deal with him, and seizes all of his funds once Crusoe leaves on his voyage, forcing Susannah to seek refuge in the home of Jeremiah Blackthorn. She refuses to believe that Crusoe is dead, despite being told otherwise. In 12 of 13 eps.

Other characters include James Crusoe (Sean Bean), Samuel Tuffley (Mark Dexter), Nathan West (Kieran Bew), Mary Crusoe (Emma Barnett), Captain Lynch (Jonathan Pienaar), Judy (Georgina Rylance), Will Atkins (Jeremy Crutchley), Cleric (James Middlemarch), Nolan Moore (Sean Michael), John Tuffley (Terence Harvey), Judge Jefferies (Joss Ackland), Fenwick (Bob Goody), and Captain Taylor (Danny Keogh).

Production

The show was made by the independent, London-based production company, Power, for the NBC network and was a co-production by Power, Moonlighting in South Africa, and Muse Entertainment in Canada.  Power has claimed this is the first time a US network "commissioned a British supplier for nearly 40 years".  Justin Bodle is the executive producer for Power, with Michael Prupas executive producer for Muse Entertainment and Genevieve Hofmeyr for Moonlighting. Other executive producers are Jeff Hayes, Stephen Greenberg and Jean Bureau. The series format has been developed for television by British writer Stephen Gallagher with a writing staff that includes Andrew Rattenbury, Debbie Oates, Nick Fisher and James Moran.

Filming
Filming began in York, England in May 2008 with an estimated budget of £17 million. Exterior footage was shot around York in location including St William's College, The Shambles, St. Leonard's hospital, the River Ouse, and York's Guildhall.  Scenes were also shot in Whitby, North Yorkshire on the replica frigate the Grand Turk.  In early June filming moved to the North Yorkshire Moors using the backdrop of the Ryedale Folk Museum, in Hutton-le-Hole.  Other filming locations for the series are the Garden Route in South Africa and the Seychelles.

Episodes

Broadcast history
The series premiered in the US in the fall (September/October) of 2008. NBC ran a heavy promotion campaign during its screening of the Beijing Summer Olympic Games. The show has been sold to other countries including Canada. The two-hour series premiere aired on October 17, 2008 at 8pm, on NBC and Citytv in Canada and originally aired on Friday nights. However, beginning in December 2008, the show moved to Saturdays, due to low ratings. The show was named one of the five worst new television shows in TelevisionWeek’s semiannual Critics Poll.

Crusoe was initially promoted as a regular TV show but, after the first few episodes aired (with poor ratings), the network listed it as a "high-action, fast-paced, thirteen-part series." NBC has no plans to continue Crusoe past the 13 episodes.

In the UK, Crusoe premiered with a double-bill on FTA Terrestrial Channel Five on 20 December 2008.  It was then played daily during the holiday period for the full 13 episodes.

In Vietnam, it was aired on VTC7-Today TV from April 26 to June 7, 2009.

Ratings

Hulu offered all 13 episodes from Season 1 until September 19, 2010.

References

External links
Twitter
 

2000s American drama television series
2008 American television series debuts
2009 American television series endings
English-language television shows
NBC original programming
Television series by Muse Entertainment
American action television series
American adventure television series
British action television series
British adventure television series
Canadian action television series
Canadian adventure television series
Television shows set in England
American adventure drama television series
Canadian adventure drama television series